John Cole, 1st Baron Mountflorence (13 October 1709 – 30 November 1767) was an Irish peer and politician.

Born in Dublin, he was the son of John Cole, Member of Parliament for Enniskillen. In 1726 he was admitted to Trinity College Dublin,
where he was educated, and four years later was returned to the Irish House of Commons as member for his father's old seat of Enniskillen, a constituency he represented until his ennoblement. He was also High Sheriff of Fermanagh in 1733. In 1760 Cole was raised to the Peerage of Ireland as Baron Mountflorence, of Florence Court in the County of Fermanagh. He took his seat in the Irish House of Lords the following year, and died six years later aged 58. He was succeeded in the barony by his son William Willoughby Cole, who was created Earl of Enniskillen in 1789.

References

Further reading
Malcomson, A. P. W. "The Enniskillen Family, Estate and Archive". Clogher Record 16, no. 2 (1998): 81–122.

1709 births
1767 deaths
Alumni of Trinity College Dublin
Barons in the Peerage of Ireland
Cole family (Anglo-Irish aristocracy)
Peers of Ireland created by George II
High Sheriffs of County Fermanagh
Cole, John
Members of the Parliament of Ireland (pre-1801) for County Fermanagh constituencies
Cole, John